Adilson Ben David Dos Santos (born 15 May 1974) is a Dutch retired footballer.

Club career
He made his professional and Eredivisie debut for Sparta on 24 January 1993 against RKC and also played for Eindhoven, Excelsior,  RKC and NEC during the 1992-2002 football seasons.

He was released by NEC in summer 2002.

References

1974 births
Living people
Footballers from Rotterdam
Dutch sportspeople of Cape Verdean descent
Association football forwards
Dutch footballers
Sparta Rotterdam players
FC Eindhoven players
Excelsior Rotterdam players
RKC Waalwijk players
NEC Nijmegen players
Eredivisie players
Eerste Divisie players